Saint Mark's Chapel is a small, formerly Episcopal chapel located on the grounds of the Mordecai House in downtown Raleigh, North Carolina.  The chapel, along with the rest of the Mordecai plantation, is on the National Register of Historic Places.  The chapel is a very popular place for weddings.

History
The Episcopalian St. Mark's Chapel was built by slave carpenters in 1847 on the Chatham County plantation of John Haughton. The chapel was moved to Siler City in 1953 for use by another congregation. Mordecai Historic Park received the chapel in 1979 and it is in use today for weddings, meetings, seminars, and lectures.

See also
Mordecai House
Historic Oakwood
Historic Oakwood Cemetery

References

Churches in Raleigh, North Carolina
Former Episcopal church buildings in the United States
Former churches in North Carolina
Chapels in the United States
Mordecai family
Churches on the National Register of Historic Places in North Carolina
National Register of Historic Places in Raleigh, North Carolina
Churches completed in 1847
Historic district contributing properties in North Carolina
19th-century Episcopal church buildings
1847 establishments in North Carolina